Gillarduzzi is a surname. Notable people with the surname include:

Jessica Gillarduzzi (born 1980), Italian bobsledder 
Luigi Gillarduzzi (1822–1856), Austrian-Italian painter
Sisto Gillarduzzi (1908–1989), Italian bobsledder and alpine skier
Umberto Gillarduzzi (1909–1994), Italian bobsledder